Institute of International Relations may refer to:

Institute of International Relations, Beijing, China
Institute of International Relations Prague
Institute of International Relations (Turkmenistan)
Institute of International Relations Yekaterinburg, Russia
Institute of International Relations, KFU, Russia
Moscow State Institute of International Relations

See also 
IIR (disambiguation)